Gradina is a municipality in Slavonia, in the Virovitica–Podravina County of Croatia. It has a population of 4,485 (2001), 85.6% which are Croats. The municipality contains eleven villages:
Gradina, Bačevac, Brezovica, Budakovac, Detkovac, Lug Gradinski, Novi Gradac, Rušani, and Žlebina.

History
In the late 19th and early 20th century, Gradina was part of the Virovitica County of the Kingdom of Croatia-Slavonia.

Notable people
 Boško Buha, famous Serbian World War II child-hero, member of the Yugoslav Partisans
 Slavko Šajber, Croatian politician, football official and former president of the Football Association of Yugoslavia

Populated places in Virovitica-Podravina County
Municipalities of Croatia
Slavonia